William August "Dutch" Ussat (April 11, 1904 – May 29, 1959) was a Major League Baseball infielder who played for two seasons. He played one game for the Cleveland Indians during the 1925 Cleveland Indians season and four games during the 1927 Cleveland Indians season.

External links

1904 births
1959 deaths
Baseball players from Dayton, Ohio
Boston Braves scouts
Buffalo Bisons (minor league) players
Cleveland Indians players
Columbus Senators players
Dayton Aviators players
Dayton Ducks players
Erie Sailors players
Major League Baseball infielders
Saginaw Aces players
Scranton Miners players
Springfield Buckeyes players
Terre Haute Tots players
Waco Cubs players